The Peru national handball team is the national team of Peru. It takes part in international handball competitions.

Tournament record

Pan American Games

Pan American Championship

South American Games

Bolivarian Games

IHF South and Central American Emerging Nations Championship

References

External links

IHF profile

Handball
Men's national handball teams